Paul Tam Kwong-Hang  was Provost and Deputy Vice-Chancellor in the University of Hong Kong (HKU), the first university in Hong Kong and in the British-Empire-controlled East Asia region, from 2015 to 2019. Before his provostship, he has already started chairing Paediatric Surgery at HKU since 1996 for decades and has received Li Shu-Pui Professorship in Surgery since 2013.

Biography

Early career 
Tam obtained his bachelor's degree of medicine from the University of Hong Kong in 1976 and began working in the Department of Surgery at the same institution for 10 years until 1986. During his stay in the department, he received his FRCS qualifications in RC SEd, RCPSG and RCSI. He later attained his ChM degree at University of Liverpool in 1984 and his MA Status at University of Oxford in 1990. He also earned the qualifications of paediatricians at Royal College of Paediatrics and Child Health. He then commenced his teaching career in the United Kingdom as senior lecturer at the University of Liverpool in 1986 to 1990 and subsequently as Reader and director of Paediatric Surgery at the University of Oxford in 1990 to 1996.

Primary leading role at University of Hong Kong 
Tam has entered the senior management team of the University of Hong Kong (HKU) since the 2000s. In 2003, he assumed the office of vice-president and pro-vice-chancellor (research). In his capacity as research head, he oversaw the strategies and development regarding researches of HKU. He was appointed associate dean of the graduate school in 2010 and was successively promoted dean of graduate school in 2014. His successor, Nirmala Rao, took over the post on 1 May 2016.

Academic achievement 
Tam possesses 4 patents and has published nearly 450 articles, over 500 conference papers and over 20 book chapters. His internationally refereed journals have almost 20000 citations, making him be ranked amongst the top 1% of most-cited scientists (ESI) and be awarded accumulated grants of more than US$20m.

Research interests 
Tam specialises in developmental biology, paediatric surgery, immunology and genomics.

Prize and Honours
30 June 2017: Justice of the Peace

Remarks

References

External Websites 
 HKU Scholars hub

Year of birth missing (living people)
Living people
Alumni of the University of Hong Kong
Academic staff of the University of Hong Kong